Poondi estate is a permanently settled zamindari estate in the Thanjavur district of Tamil Nadu, India. It is administered by the Vandayar family of the kallar caste.

See also 
 Rao Bahadur V. Appasamy Vandayar
 K. Thulasiah Vandayar
 A.V.V.M Sri Pushpam College

References 

 

Zamindari estates
Thanjavur district